George Edozie (born 1972), is a Nigerian painter. living in Lagos, Nigeria.

Early life and education 
George Edozie was born on 11 May 1972. He attended the University Primary School, Nsukka, Washington Memorial School, Onitsha. Edozie studied Fine & Applied Arts at the University of Benin in Benin City where he majored in painting and graduated with a BA degree in 1996.

Career 
George Edozie has featured widely in group exhibitions in Nigeria and abroad. Some of them include: "Six Egbeda Artists" at the National Museum, Onikan, Lagos, 2002; "The Search" at the French Cultural Centre, Ikoyi, Lagos, 2004; "With a Human Face" at the Pan-African University, Lagos, 2006; and "A Kaleidoscope of Nigerian traditional costumes" at Abuja, 2009.

His work is part of the collection at the Pan-African Heritage Museum in Accra, Ghana.

References

External links 
 George EDOZIE
 For Edozie, identity on trial

Year of birth missing (living people)
Living people
Nigerian painters
Artists from Lagos
University of Benin (Nigeria) alumni